Jenišovice is a municipality and village in Chrudim District in the Pardubice Region of the Czech Republic. It has about 400 inhabitants.

Administrative parts
Villages of Martinice, Mravín, Štěnec and Zalažany are administrative parts of Jenišovice.

Notable people
Svatopluk Pitra (1923–1993), graphic designer, illustrator and cartoonist

References

External links

Villages in Chrudim District